Châu Thành is a township and capital of Châu Thành District, Sóc Trăng Province, Vietnam.

References

Populated places in Sóc Trăng province
District capitals in Vietnam
Townships in Vietnam